The Misterio de Elche, in English the Mystery Play of Elche or Elche Mystery Play and in Catalan Misteri d'Elx, is a liturgical drama from the Middle Ages that reenacts  the Dormition and Assumption of the Blessed Virgin Mary.

The two-act mystery play is performed annually on 14 and 15 August in the Basilica de Santa María in the city of Elche. In 2001, UNESCO declared it one of the Masterpieces of the Oral and Intangible Heritage of Humanity and, in 2008, inscribed it on its Representative List.

Origins
Two stories exist regarding the date of creation of the Misteri d'Elx. The older account, which placed its origin in the 13th century, was put forth by Cristobal Sanz in his history of the city written at the beginning of the 17th century. After confessing that he was unable to prove his history, he proposed that the earliest inhabitants of the city had celebrated it in 1276. He also adds another older story: after the conquest of the city by James I the Conqueror in 1265, the inhabitants of the city conceived the idea of a mystery play on the day the city was retaken from the Moors.

In 1717, José Antón, Attorney General of the Marquisate of Elche, also supported the theory and added a miraculous element: the arrival on the beaches of Elche of a mysterious ark in May 1266. The box contained the image of the Virgin of the Assumption that is today enshrined in the basilica and the Consueta, a document containing the script and occasionally the music of the play. This story was maintained in part to excuse a possible mistake of the composer, Óscar Esplá (1886–1976), who asserted that in 1924, he had been shown a letter of 1266 authorizing the play. This letter was allegedly preserved in the Municipal Archives of Elche, despite the fact that it has never been seen since or even cited. The work carried out by Esplá, and his importance as a composer, revived the theory of the play's origin in the 13th century.

Since the end of the 19th century when historians first arrived at Elche and studied the play, the date of its composition was given a terminus ante quem sometime around the turn of 15th century. At present, most scholars from  multiple disciplines (literary, theatrical, musical, linguistics, iconographic, etc.) agree to it composition in the latter half of the 15th century, without emphasizing any precedents in existence in the city.

Scene
The play is performed within the Basilica, and the stage comprises several areas and devices:

The Heaven
The great linen, located at the height of the ring of the basilica's dome, fulfills the double function of representing the sky and concealing mechanisms that permit the ascent and descent of aerial stage devices. It is possibly as old as the current play, since older stage directions from as early as 1530 already seem to indicate its presence.

The linen acts as a divider between celestial and earthly actions, and possesses a peephole towards the choir called the "Door to Heaven". The Door is a square aperture that is opened and closed three times during the play in order to admit aerial stage devices.

La Magrana

This aerial device, called la magrana ("the pomegranate"), transports the first Angel who delivers the golden palm frond to Mary, and shows her the way to heaven. In its current form, the device dates the second half of the 16th century. Both its structure and its name are reminiscent of period mechanisms commonly used in Spain, such as boxes, globes, and armillary spheres.

Until recently, the term “pomegranate” was thought to be quite modern, with the term “cloud” considered to be more ancient and correct. This was thought to have been the result of the device's supposedly having changed in colour from an older blue to red. Modern research, however, suggests that the name was already used in the 16th century, possibly because the current, more compact and sturdy device replaced a less substantial structure made of cotton, paper, and fabric.

The Araceli
The Araceli is the second aerial device to appear, and enters the scene on two occasions. It is first used by five angels who fetch Mary's soul (in the form of a statuette) to Heaven; four of the angels sing as the central angel (often a priest) bears the Virgin's spirit. They appear to the Apostles, who organize a procession to bury her body. Its second appearance is in the great finale, where the fifth angel with Mary's soul is replaced by the full image of Mary. This image is taken into the ceiling and is crowned by the Holy Trinity at the halfway point of its ascension.

The Araceli is not a statue unique to the mystery play. It is similar to sculptures made at the end of the 15th century and the beginning of the 16th.

Cadafal 
This is the platform on which much of the drama takes place. Roughly square in shape and covered in wood, it is raised to conceal the hollow that it contains. There is where some aerial devices descend, where actors change costumes, or disappear into. It is located under the dome and the Heaven, but extends in part into the choir to connect the Sepulchre with the shaft of the Door of Heaven.

In Elche, the Cadafal is, in words of Quirante Santacruz, "Mary's area, which contains the places that are hers exclusively, her house and her tomb. Here, the Virgin experiences all the process of sacralization and glorification that contains the work, it is the only place where celestial personages and earthly people live together".

The term "cadafal" appears early on in the first reports of mystery plays staged within of churches with an invariable meaning: dais or platform where the dramatic action takes place.

The Corridor
This is the great ramp built on top of the Basilica's main aisle. It rises from the principal door to the Cadafal; two small bays to the each side at the point where it joins the latter provide seating for three lay organisers and the priest overseeing the play.

Its importance is largely symbolic, primarily because it is the only physical element that converts the entire church into a framework for dramatic actions. Secondarily, the walkway is the road that permits communication between the earthly and the divine, and represents the spiritual road that everyone travels.

During the play, the actor playing Mary also travels this path, from the door to the Cadafal, symbolising her total achievement of the Christian ideal of uniting with the Christ through his Passion.

Music
The music for the play is contained in the Consueta, a portmanteau of the words Consuetudine and Ordinatio. These manuscripts of the liturgical ceremonies, which contain precious annotations on stage directions, musical score, and stage devices, date from as early as 1625.

Performances

Normal
August 14 is when the first act, known as La Vesprà ("The Vigil") is performed. As it is the eve of the Feast of the Assumption, it recounts the final hours and Death of the Virgin, when her soul is brought to Heaven leaving her corpse surrounded by the grieving Apostles.

August 15 is when the second act, known as La Festa ("The Feast") is staged. It focuses on the burial, Assumption and Coronation of the Virgin. It begins at 10 o'clock with "El Soterrar" ("The Interment"): this portion takes place in the streets outside the basilica, with a procession of the image of the dead Virgin, the actors, and bands playing songs of La Festa.

Preparations
In the weeks leading to the staging of the Misteri, several preparatory events occur.

On August 6, in the Room of the Council, "la prova de veus" ("the test of voices") takes place, to select those who will sing in the Misteri. This shows that Elche's City Council, and not the Church, financially supports the play.

At 6 o'clock in the evening of August 10, "La prova de l'àngel" ("the test of the angel") is conducted inside the basilica. This is when organizers identify children resistant to dizziness, who are thus fit to descend and ascend on the aerial stage devices.

Extraordinary
On 11–13 August, the so-called "Assajos generals" or extraordinary representations, take place.

Antisemitism
The play has been criticized for its viciously medieval portrayals of evil Jews, with critic David Nirenberg asking whether the sponsors ought to remove the racist material as the actors in the Oberammergau Passion Play have done, and pointing out that the play, which will be broadcast on Facebook for the first time in 2019, violates Facebook's hate-speech policy.

See also
Oberammergau Passion Play

References

 Misteri d'Elx / Misterio de Elche. Consueta de 1709. Maricarmen Gómez & Francesc Massip. Tirant lo Blanch. Valencia. 2010

External links
Web del Patronato Nacional del Misteri d'Elx - Misterio de Elche
La Tramoia 
Tribute to the "Mystery of Elche" by Jordi Savall and La Capella Reial de Catalunya
UNESCO Intangible Heritage Site (in English)
Misteri d´Elx - Historia y Representación - Elche Se Mueve Portal Temático de Elche (in spanish)

Valencian culture
Valencian
Masterpieces of the Oral and Intangible Heritage of Humanity
Spanish folk music
Medieval drama
Elche
Bien de Interés Cultural landmarks in the Province of Alicante
Christianity and antisemitism
Plays set in the 1st century
Plays based on the Bible